Block Island Southeast Light is a lighthouse located on Mohegan Bluffs at the southeastern corner of Block Island, Rhode Island. It was designated a U.S. National Historic Landmark in 1997 as one of the most architecturally sophisticated lighthouses built in the United States in the 19th century.

Description and history 
Although Congress appropriated $9,000 to build this light in 1856, the funds were used to build a new Block Island North Light after the old one was washed away in a storm. This light was finally built in 1874, with the lamp first lit on February 1, 1875. It is a sophisticated expression of the Gothic Revival executed in brick, and was a marked contrast to earlier lighthouses, which were generally more functional in appearance. This is topped by a sixteen-sided pyramidal copper roof with a ball ventilator and lightning rod. The original roof was cast iron, and was replaced in 1994.

The keeper's house is attached to the tower by a 1-1/2 story connecting wing. It is a 2-1/2 story brick structure with identical projecting 1-1/2 story kitchen wings at its rear, and a steeply pitched gable roof with windows extending into the roofline. There are porches on either side of the connector, one for each of the two dwellings in the building, which were originally identical. That on the southwest side has retained original trim, which includes beveled, bracketed posts. The north wing was designated for the keeper, while the south wing was for his assistants. The only major alterations to the residences have been for the introduction of modern plumbing (in 1938) and the repair of storm-related damage. The roof was originally shingled, and since has been covered by a variety of materials, most recently slate shingles.

The lard oil was replaced by kerosene in the 1880s. The lens was modified in 1929 to rotate floating on a pool of mercury, at first driven by a clockwork mechanism, which was replaced by a small electric motor.

In 1990, the Coast Guard deactivated the light and replaced it with a nearby steel tower. Because of ongoing erosion of the bluffs, in 1993 the entire 2,000 ton structure was moved about  back from the cliffs. After the move, the Coast Guard decided not to retain the rotating mercury float lens, but instead installed the first order fixed lens which had been removed in 1980 from the Cape Lookout Lighthouse. Ownership of the lighthouse was transferred in 1992 to the Southeast Lighthouse Foundation, which is dedicated to its preservation.

The light was listed on the National Register of Historic Places in 1990, and designated a National Historic Landmark in 1997. The latter designation was made in recognition of the light's historic importance as an aid to navigation, and for its sophisticated architecture, which was only matched by the Cleveland Light, which was demolished in the early 20th century. As of its 1997 designation, it was one of only 12 lighthouses which used a first-order Fresnel lens.

Museum 
The lighthouse has a small museum and gift shop in the base of the tower. The tower is open during the summer season offering guided tours to the top, for a fee of $10 as of September 2015. Proceeds from tours are used for restoration of the lighthouse.

Keepers and assistants

See also

Block Island North Light
List of National Historic Landmarks in Rhode Island
National Register of Historic Places listings in Washington County, Rhode Island

References

External links

Southeast Lighthouse Foundation

SAH Archipedia Building Entry

Images

Lighthouses in Washington County, Rhode Island
Lighthouse museums in Rhode Island
Museums in Washington County, Rhode Island
New Shoreham, Rhode Island
Lighthouses completed in 1874
Lighthouses on the National Register of Historic Places in Rhode Island
National Historic Landmark lighthouses
National Historic Landmarks in Rhode Island
National Register of Historic Places in Washington County, Rhode Island
1867 establishments in Rhode Island
Brick buildings and structures
Relocated buildings and structures in Rhode Island
Historic American Engineering Record in Rhode Island
Gothic Revival architecture in Rhode Island